Sembach is a municipality in the district of Kaiserslautern in the state of Rhineland-Palatinate, Germany. It forms part of the Verbandsgemeinde of Enkenbach-Alsenborn. The town is nestled in the Palatinate Forest Nature Park between Kaiserslautern and Donnersbergkreis. Sembach was first mentioned in the 13th century, in a document about a donation to the monastery of Enkenbach.

Politics

Municipal council
The municipal council of Sembach has 17 members, including the mayor (Bürgermeister).

(Dated: elections June 13, 2004)

Sembach By Car
The Bundesstraße 40 runs through the edge of the town. The Bundesautobahn 63 (Kaiserslautern- Mainz) exit Sembach, is 1 km from the middle of Sembach. Frankfurt is 107 km north from Sembach, and downtown Kaiserslautern (Stadtmitte) is about 8 km away.

American military influence
Headquarters of 17th Air Force from October 1972 until September 30, 1996. Dependent schooling from Kindergarten to 3rd grade is in Sembach Elementary School and grades 4th-9th in Sembach Middle School. Many other buildings consist of Sembach Annex accomplishing a variety of missions for the United States Air Force. Sembach Airbase was shut down in 1996 with the runway shutting down and the remainder of Sembach AB being transferred to its current status as an annex of Ramstein Air Base.  The former runway has been mostly dismantled except for a small stretch at the eastern end with the remainder of the former facility now being an industrial park.  An article dated 26 January 2010 in the Stars & Stripes stated the facility would be turned over to the U.S. Army by the end of fiscal year 2010 (30 Sep 2010)

References

External links
 Sembach Missileers - 38th TAC Missile Wing Missileers stationed at Sembach AB, Germany, 1959-1966

Municipalities in Rhineland-Palatinate
American diaspora in Europe
Kaiserslautern (district)
North Palatinate
Palatinate Forest